Yurani Blanco Calbet (born 3 February 1998) is a Spanish professional racing cyclist, who currently rides for UCI Women's Continental Team .

References

External links

1998 births
Living people
Spanish female cyclists
Place of birth missing (living people)